The following lists events that happened during 1882 in the Kingdom of Belgium.

Incumbents
Monarch: Leopold II
Prime Minister:Walthère Frère-Orban

Events

 Louis Dollo reconstructs the iguanodons found in Bernissart.
 7 January – Léon and Armand Peltzer murder Guillaume Bernays at 159 Rue de la Loi, Brussels (the Peltzer Case).
 6 May – North Sea Fisheries Convention signed, to come into effect in 1884.
 22 May – Provincial elections
 13 June – Legislative elections
 31 July – Désiré-Joseph Mercier appointed to the new chair in Thomist philosophy at the Catholic University of Louvain.
 27 November – The Peltzer Case comes to trial before the Brussels Court of assizes.
 December – Jean-Charles Houzeau leads a scientific expedition to San Antonio, Texas, to observe a transit of Venus in order to determine the solar parallax.

Publications
Periodicals
 Bulletins de l'Acadie royale des sciences, des lettres et des beaux-arts de Belgique, 3rd series, vol. 4

Conference proceedings
 Congrès international de l'enseignement, Bruxelles, 1880: Discussions (Brussels, Librairie de l'Office de Publicité)

Art and architecture

Buildings
 Henri Rieck's Passage du Nord opens in Brussels
 1 July – Last stone laid of Palais de Justice, Brussels (formally opened 1883)

Births
 10 January – Eugène Joseph Delporte, astronomer (died 1955)
 5 February – Georges Dandoy, missionary (died 1962)
 1 April – Paul Anspach, fencer (died 1981)
 16 June – Josef Christiaens, driver and aviator (died 1919)
 10 July – Henri Anspach, fencer (died 1979)
 15 July – Albert Hustin, doctor (died 1967)
 2 September – Nico Gunzburg, criminologist (died 1984)
 19 October – Norbert Wallez, newspaper editor (died 1952)

Deaths
 7 February – Édouard De Bièfve (born 1808), painter
 9 July – Louis-Charles Verwee (born 1832), painter
 25 September – Désiré van Monckhoven (born 1834), photographer
 17 November – Henri Julien Allard (born 1803), politician

References

 
1880s in Belgium
Belgium
Years of the 19th century in Belgium
Belgium